155 North Wacker is a 48-story skyscraper located in Chicago, Illinois designed by Goettsch Partners and was developed by the John Buck Company.  It stands 638 feet (195 m).  It has received LEED silver pre-certification. The construction started in 2007 and was completed in 2009.

See also
List of tallest buildings in Chicago

References 

Leadership in Energy and Environmental Design basic silver certified buildings
Skyscraper office buildings in Chicago
Office buildings completed in 2009
2009 establishments in Illinois